Attintlo Adde Mogudu ( Tenant Husband in Mother-in-law's House) is a 1991 Telugu-language comedy film, produced by K. C. Reddy under the Sri Rajeeva Productions banner and directed by Relangi Narasimha Rao. It stars Rajendra Prasad, Nirosha  and music composed by M. M. Keeravani. The film is a remake of the Hindi movie Ghar Ho To Aisa (1990), starring Anil Kapoor and Meenakshi Seshadri in pivotal roles. The film was recorded as a Hit at the box office.

Plot
The film begins on Gopi an unemployed guy consisting unmethodical family where everyone is flawed, avaricious parents Subba Rao (Suthi Velu) & Durgamma (Y. Vijaya), vain brother Vijay (Ahuthi Prasad), termagant sister Kanchana (Deepika), and simpleton Bhaja Govindam (Mallikarjuna Rao). The exclusive that showers endearment on Gopi is his sister-in-law Sharada (Vaishnavi) whom he looks upon as his mother. Since Durgamma & Kanchana are virago they torture Sharada physically and verbally. During his quest for a job, Gopi is acquainted with a beautiful girl Jhansi (Nirosha) a men hater by petty quarrels. At a point, G.M.Rao (Gollapudi Maruthi Rao) father of Jhansi realizes Gopi's honesty, appoints him as his manager and requests him to change the attitude of Jhansi. Just after, Gopi moves for a camp when Durgamma forces and necks out Sharada for Rs 10,000. Being cognizant of it, Sharada's mother (Dubbing Janaki) succumbs. So, Sharada attempts suicide with her kid Pinky (Baby Srileka) when Jhansi saves them. Nevertheless, the family is apathetic towards the deaths and nonchalantly arranges remarriage of Vijay with Sony (Disco Shanthi), daughter of a millionaire Dwaraka Prasad (Vankayala). After return, Gopi learns the tragedy gets shatter and quits the house. Soon, he is overjoyed spotting Sharada & Pinky alive. Right now, Gopi vows revenge against his toxic family and makes a play with the help of Jhansi. Both of them get in as a newly wedded couple and teases them. During the interval, they fall for each other. Parallelly, they also make Vijay remorseful for his deeds through Sony. Thereupon, the children criticize the baneful behavior of elders and desert them. At last, Sharada arrival when everyone pleads forgiveness. Finally, the movie ends with the marriage of Gopi & Jhansi.

Cast

Rajendra Prasad as Gopi
Nirosha as Jhansi
Gollapudi Maruti Rao as G. M. Rao
Suthi Velu as Subba Rao
Ahuti Prasad as Vijay
Mallikarjuna Rao as Bhaja Govindam
Chitti Babu as Swamy
Vankayala Satyanayana as Dwaraka Prasad
Disco Shanthi as Sony
Vaishnavi as Sharada
Deepika as Kanchana
Chandrika as Milk seller
Chilakala Radha
Dubbing Janaki as Sharada's mother
Kalpana Rai
Y. Vijaya as Durgamma 
Master Baladitya as Gopi's nephew
Baby Srileka as Puppy

Soundtrack

Music composed by M. M. Keeravani. Music released on LEO Audio Company.

Other
 VCDs and DVDs on - SHALIMAR Video Company, Hyderabad

References

1991 films
1990s Telugu-language films
Indian comedy-drama films
Telugu remakes of Hindi films
Films directed by Relangi Narasimha Rao
Films scored by M. M. Keeravani
1991 comedy-drama films